The following is a list of Malayalam films released in the year 2000.

Dubbed films

 2000
2000
Malayalam
 Mal
2000 in Indian cinema